Pioneer Square may refer to:

Pioneer Courthouse Square, a town square in Portland, Oregon, United States
Pioneer Square, Seattle, a neighborhood in Seattle, Washington, United States